Les Sablons is a station on Line 1 of the Paris Métro in the commune of Neuilly-sur-Seine west of the city.  In 2019 Les Sablons ranked 53rd in passenger volume among the system's 302 stations. The station is located under Avenue Charles de Gaulle, a major traffic artery between Etoile and La Defense.  It has four entrances, a pair located on each of the medians on opposite sides of the Avenue.

The name of the station and its immediate neighborhood derives from the Plaine des Sablons, as much of present-day Neuilly was known prior to its urbanization. The station signage is subtitled "Jardin d'Acclimatation," referring to the leisure park in the Bois de Boulogne 300 meters to the south.  The Jardin is linked to the station area by the Boulevard des Sablons, whose name changes to Rue d’Orleans as it approaches Avenue Charles de Gaulle.

History 
The station opened in April 1937, when Line 1 of the Paris Metro was extended west from Porte Maillot to Pont de Neuilly under Neuilly's principal commercial thoroughfare, the Avenue de Neuilly (renamed Avenue Charles de Gaulle in 1971). At the same time, the Avenue was significantly widened to serve as an arterial route for automobile traffic, and the project marked the end of the Fête de Neuilly, a summer street carnival held for over a century in what had become a well-heeled urban district.  Initial planning in the early 1930s envisaged two stations between Porte Maillot and Pont de Neuilly, at Place du Marché and Rue St. Pierre, but Les Sablons was built instead. Work on the Line 1 extension was pressed to completion in time for the 1937 International Exposition.  In the 1970s the station was remodeled in the style Andreu-Motte. In 2003, the corridors were remodeled as part of a system-wide program.  In 2009, the platforms were fitted with platform screen doors in anticipation of the fully-automated operation of Line 1.

Prior to its urbanization, much of the area immediately to the north of the Bois de Boulogne was known as the Plaine des Sablons, for its sterile soil and sand pits whose output was much used in the construction of Paris. In the 1780s, Louis XVI granted part of the Champs des Sablons, an area used for training by the King's Guards, to Antoine-Augustin Parmentier, who demonstrated the growing of potatoes, and promoted their acceptance in continental Europe as safe for human consumption. During the 19th century, this rural area gave way to suburban, then urban, development.

The Jardin d'Acclimatation opened in 1860 on 20 hectares in the northwest corner of the Bois de Boulogne, as a feature in the transformation of the Bois from public woodlands into an urban park.  The Jardin was initially a zoo and botanical garden emphasizing species from tropical and sub-tropical regions. From 1877 to 1927 it also included an "ethnological garden", a human zoo featuring the physiques and cultures of non-European indigenous peoples.  After 1910, there was increased focus on carnival rides and entertainments, following the example of Copenhagen's Tivoli Gardens. These, in turn, were displaced in the 1950s in favor of an area "for walks and outdoor activities of an instructional, sporting, and family nature", and in the 1960s and '70s the Jardin featured popular, rural, and traditional French culture.  In recent years, amusements and wild animals have returned to what is now a family-oriented leisure park, focusing on children's activities.  The original name has never changed.

Station layout

Places of interest
Nearby on the northern edge of the Bois de Boulogne are the Musée national des Arts et Traditions populaires and the Jardin d'Acclimatation. One of the exits is in front of the private gate into the offices of the M6 television channel.

Gallery

References

Roland, Gérard (2003). Stations de métro. D’Abbesses à Wagram. Éditions Bonneton.

Paris Métro stations in Neuilly-sur-Seine
Railway stations in France opened in 1937